Ross Kemp: Behind the Story is a chat show series shown on Sky1. The show is hosted by newsreader Dermot Murnaghan and with interviewee actor Ross Kemp, best known for his role of Grant Mitchell in the show EastEnders.

2009 British television series debuts
2009 British television series endings
Sky UK original programming
Television series by Endemol